Major-General Lars Sivert Lervik (born 12 July 1971) is a Norwegian army officer and the Chief of the Norwegian Army since 25 June 2020.

Early life 
Lars Sivert Lervik was born on 12 July 1971 in Øksendal, Møre og Romsdal.

Military service 
Lervik joined the Norwegian Army on 3 July 1990.

After attending the Officers School for the Cavalry, Lervik joined the Armoured Battalion as a vehicle commander.

In 2003, Lervik completed the Armor Captain Career Course at Fort Knox in Kentucky.

Lervik studied at the Advanced Command and Staff College in Shrivenham, England from 2006 to 2007.

From 2016 to 2017, Lervik attended the United States Army War College in Carlisle, Pennsylvania.

Chief of the Army 
Lervik was promoted to Major-General and made Chief of the Army on 25 June 2020, succeeding Major-General Eirik Kristoffersen.

In January 2021, Lervik expressed his support for winter NATO exercises in Norway during the COVID-19 pandemic, arguing that it is an important part of Norwegian security that the alliance is able to operate under the conditions in Norway.

References 

1971 births
Living people
Norwegian Army generals
People from Møre og Romsdal
Norwegian Military Academy alumni